Jon Debus (born August 31, 1958 in Chicago Heights, Illinois) is an American former Minor League Baseball catcher, first baseman, third baseman, outfielder, coach, and manager.  In 2011, he served as bullpen coach for the NY Mets.

Biography
Debus was originally drafted as an outfielder by the Los Angeles Dodgers in the 21st round of the 1980 MLB Draft out of College of St. Francis. He played in the Dodgers minor league system from 1980-1989.

After his playing career ended, he became a coach and then a Manager in the Dodgers minor league system. He was also the General Manager of the Elmira Pioneers from 2000–2001, and the Minor League catching coordinator for the Dodgers from 2002–2004. After decades in the minors, Debus became bullpen coach for the Dodgers in 2005, manager Jim Tracy telling the Los Angeles Times on April 1, 2005, "It was time he was rewarded for his loyalty to the organization."

He was bullpen coach for the New York Mets during the 2011 season, but was not hired back for 2012 as he was replaced by Ricky Bones.

Playing career
Lethbridge Dodgers
Vero Beach Dodgers
Lodi Dodgers (-)
San Antonio Dodgers
Albuquerque Dukes (-, -)

Coaching career
San Antonio Missions
Vero Beach Dodgers
Albuquerque Dukes (-)
Vero Beach Dodgers
Orix Buffaloes (-)

Managing career
Great Falls Dodgers (-)
Vero Beach Dodgers (-)

References

External links

1958 births
Minor league baseball managers
Los Angeles Dodgers coaches
Los Angeles Dodgers scouts
People from Chicago Heights, Illinois
Living people
Major League Baseball bullpen catchers
Major League Baseball bullpen coaches
New York Mets coaches
Lethbridge Dodgers players
Vero Beach Dodgers players
Lodi Dodgers players
San Antonio Dodgers players
Albuquerque Dukes players
Nippon Professional Baseball coaches